Major General Trần Thanh Phong (19 January 1926 – 1 December 1972) was an officer of the Army of the Republic of Vietnam.

Trần Thanh Phong served as the commander of the South Vietnamese I Corps, which oversaw the northernmost part of the country, from 20 May to 30 May 1964, when he was replaced by Lieutenant General Hoàng Xuân Lãm. He was one of five different I Corps commanders in two months, as Prime Minister Nguyễn Cao Kỳ struggled to find a leader of whom he approved while the Buddhist Uprising was taking place.

Trần subsequently served as the head of the pacification program, head of the Republic of Vietnam National Police and finally as deputy commander of Military Region II.

Trần was killed on 1 December 1972 when the Republic of Vietnam Air Force plane he was travelling on crashed in bad weather on approach to Tuy Hoa Air Base. Four other South Vietnamese and two USAID officials were also killed in the crash.

References

1926 births
1972 deaths
Army of the Republic of Vietnam generals